Otitoma is a genus of sea snails, marine gastropod mollusks in the family Pseudomelatomidae.

This genus consists of species with a rather variable appearance. Their different morphology points to an uncommon diversification.

Taxonomy
This genus was considered a nomen dubium by Powell in 1966, until Kilburn resurrected it in 2004. He considered Thelecytharella a synonym of Otitoma. Finally in 2011 Bouchet et al. closed the debate about this genera based on molecular evidence and assigned Otitoma to the family Pseudomelatomidae.

Species
Species within the genus Otitoma include:

 Otitoma astrolabensis Wiedrick, 2014
 Otitoma aureolineata Stahlschmidt, Poppe & Tagaro, 2018
 Otitoma batjanensis (Schepman, 1913) 
 Otitoma boucheti Morassi, Nappo & Bonfitto, 2017
 Otitoma carnicolor (Hervier, 1896)
 Otitoma crassivaricosa Morassi, Nappo & Bonfitto, 2017
 Otitoma crokerensis (Shuto, 1983)
 Otitoma cyclophora (Deshayes, 1863)
 Otitoma deluta (Gould, 1860)
 Otitoma elegans Morassi, Nappo & Bonfitto, 2017
 Otitoma fergusoni Wiedrick, 2014
 Otitoma gouldi (Yen, 1944)
 Otitoma hadra Morassi, Nappo & Bonfitto, 2017
 Otitoma jennyae Stahlschmidt, Poppe & Tagaro, 2018
 † Otitoma kagoshimaensis (Shuto, 1965) 
 Otitoma kecil (Sysoev, 1997)
 Otitoma kwandangensis (Schepman, 1913)
 Otitoma lirata (Reeve, 1845)
 Otitoma metuloides (Kilburn, 1995)
 Otitoma neocaledonica Morassi, Nappo & Bonfitto, 2017
 Otitoma nereidum Morassi, Nappo & Bonfitto, 2017
 Otitoma oneili (Barnard, 1958)
 † Otitoma oyamai (Shuto, 1965) 
 Otitoma philippinensis Morassi, Nappo & Bonfitto, 2017
 Otitoma philpoppei Morassi, Nappo & Bonfitto, 2017
 Otitoma pictolabra Stahlschmidt, Poppe & Tagaro, 2018
 Otitoma porcellana Stahlschmidt, Poppe & Tagaro, 2018
 Otitoma rubiginosa (Hinds, 1843)
 Otitoma rubiginostoma Morassi, Nappo & Bonfitto, 2017
 Otitoma sororcula Morassi, Nappo & Bonfitto, 2017
 Otitoma timorensis (Schepman, 1913)
 Otitoma tropispira Morassi, Nappo & Bonfitto, 2017
 Otitoma vitrea (Reeve, 1845)
 Otitoma wiedricki Stahlschmidt, Poppe & Tagaro, 2018
 Otitoma xantholineata Morassi, Nappo & Bonfitto, 2017

Species brought into synonymy
 Otitoma crenulata Pease, 1868: synonym of Otitoma cyclophora (Deshayes, 1863)
 Otitoma mitra (Kilburn, 1986): synonym of Otitoma cyclophora (Deshayes, 1863)
 Otitoma ottitoma Jousseaume, 1898: synonym of Otitoma cyclophora (Deshayes, 1863)

References

 Wiedrick S.G. (2014). Review of the genera Otitoma Jousseaume, 1880 and Thelecytharella with the description of two new species Gastropoda: Conoidea: Pseudomelatomidae) from the southwest Pacific Ocean. The Festivus. 46(3): 40-53

External links
 
 Jousseaume, F. (1898). Description d’un mollusque nouveau. Le Naturaliste. 20[= ser. 2, 12] (268): 106-107
 Worldwide Mollusc Species Data Base: Pseudomelatomidae

 
Pseudomelatomidae
Gastropod genera